Wei Shihao (born 8 April 1995) is a Chinese professional footballer who currently plays for and captains Chinese Super League club Guangzhou F.C. as a right-footed left winger.

Club career
Wei Shihao started his football career when he joined Shandong Luneng's youth academy in 2005. He was deemed as a high potential player and was listed in a Bleacher Report article titled "Eight Teenagers Who Should Be on Every Big Club's Radar." In December 2012, he was recommended to Eredivisie giants Ajax for a trial along with Wang Chengkuai by former Ajax manager and youth scout Henk ten Cate, who managed for Shandong during the 2012 season. However, Shandong subsequently refused Ajax's trial request, forcing Wei to stay at the club.

In September 2013, Wei refused to sign a professional contract with Shandong and joined Segunda Divisão side Boavista's youth academy on a free transfer. He signed a new two-year contract with the club in June 2014 and was then promoted to the first team, whose application for participation in the Primeira Liga was approved. On 14 September 2014, Wei made his debut for the club in a 1–0 win against Académica de Coimbra, coming on as a substitute for Christian Pouga in the 50th minute.

On 15 July 2015, Wei transferred to Segunda Liga side Feirense. He made his debut for the club on 30 August 2015 in a 1–1 draw against Sporting Covilhã. On 31 December 2015, Wei transferred to fellow second-tier side Leixões. He made his debut for the club on 27 January 2016 in a 4–0 loss against Belenenses in the 2015-16 Taça da Liga. On 25 February 2017, Wei extended his contract with the club until 30 June 2018 and was loaned to Chinese Super League side Shanghai SIPG for the 2017 season. He made his debut and scored his first goal for the club on 7 April 2017 in a 2–1 win against Shandong Luneng.

On 7 January 2018, Wei transferred to top-tier side Beijing Guoan. On 2 February 2019, Wei transferred to fellow top-tier side Guangzhou Evergrande. He would go on to establish himself as a regular within the team and go on to win the 2019 Chinese Super League title with the club.

International career
Wei made his debut for the Chinese national team on 9 December 2017 in a 2–2 draw against South Korea in the 2017 EAFF E-1 Football Championship, scoring his first international goal.

Career statistics

Club statistics

International statistics

International goals
 
Scores and results list China's goal tally first.

Honours

Club
Beijing Guoan
Chinese FA Cup: 2018

Guangzhou Evergrande
Chinese Super League: 2019

References

External links
 
 

1995 births
Living people
Chinese footballers
Footballers from Anhui
People from Bengbu
Association football wingers
China youth international footballers
China international footballers
Primeira Liga players
Liga Portugal 2 players
Chinese Super League players
Shanghai Port F.C. players
Beijing Guoan F.C. players
Guangzhou F.C. players
Boavista F.C. players
C.D. Feirense players
Chinese expatriate footballers
Expatriate footballers in Portugal
Chinese expatriate sportspeople in Portugal
Footballers at the 2018 Asian Games
2019 AFC Asian Cup players
Asian Games competitors for China